This is a list of basketball clubs playing in the French league system. It includes one club in Monaco, AS Monaco.

Contents : A B C D G H L N O P Q R S T V By League



A

B

C

D

E

F

G

H

L

M

N

O

P

Q

R

S

T

V

Notes

By League
Here's a list of all the clubs playing in the French basketball league system in the following levels:
 Pro A clubs
Some other clubs are listed:
 Pro B clubs
 Women clubs
 Lower leagues clubs